Huaqiang Road / Rd station, formerly "Huaqianglu station", is a station on Line 1 of the Shenzhen Metro. It opened on 28 December 2004. It is located under in Shennan Middle Road at the junction of Huafu Road and Huaqiang Road in Futian District, Shenzhen, China. It is the third-busiest station in the network in terms of entries and exits at 49,500 passengers a day. It serves the shopping district of Huaqiangbei.

Station layout

Exits

See also 
Huaqiangbei

References

External links
 Shenzhen Metro Huaqiang Road Station (Chinese)
 Shenzhen Metro Huaqiang Road Station (English)

Railway stations in Guangdong
Shenzhen Metro stations
Futian District
Railway stations in China opened in 2004
Railway stations located underground in China